The Hacienda League is a high school athletic league that is part of the CIF Southern Section. Member schools are located in the eastern San Gabriel Valley. Rowland High School, Diamond Bar High School and Bonita High School left the league after the 2013–14 school year, and Chino High School joined from the Palomares League.

Schools
 John A. Rowland High School
 Los Altos High School
 South Hills High School
 Diamond Bar High School
 Walnut High School
 Glen A. Wilson High School

References

CIF Southern Section leagues